Lu Ke (born 23 May 1965) is a Chinese materials scientist. He was born in Huachi County, Gansu, and received his bachelor's degree at East China Institute of Technology. In January 1990, he received a doctor's degree at the Institute of Metals Research of the Chinese Academy of Sciences, and became a researcher there 3 years later. In 1993, he was awarded first class natural science prize of the CAS. In 2003, he was elected to the Chinese Academy of Sciences at the age of 38, making him one of the youngest academicians in the history of the CAS. He is mainly known for his work in the field of crystallization of amorphous metals.

He is also involved in politics and is a member of the Jiusan Society. He currently serves as a delegate to the 13th National Committee of the Chinese People's Political Consultative Conference and Vice-Governor of Liaoning province.

References

1965 births
Living people
Chemists from Gansu
Chinese materials scientists
Members of the Chinese Academy of Sciences
Members of the Chinese People's Political Consultative Conference
People from Qingyang
Fellows of the Minerals, Metals & Materials Society
Members of the Jiusan Society
Political office-holders in Liaoning